Baron Simon Grundel-Helmfelt (1617–1677) was a Swedish field marshal and governor. Helmfelt is most notable for his overwhelming victory at the Battle of Lund despite being heavily outnumbered by Danish troops.

Military career

He served in the Thirty Years' War from 1641 and distinguished himself at the Battle of Breitenfeld and received his first commission.

He was knighted in 1646, when he changed his name from Grundel to Grundel-Helmfelt. Later that year he was wounded outside Rain am Lech by a musket bullet. In 1649 he was promoted to Colonel of the Artillery and in 1655 to General of the Infantry. In 1656, he was appointed Governor of Riga, where he successfully defended the town against Tsar Alexej and his army of 90,000 men. He became Governor-General of Ingria in 1658.

Helmfelt returned to Stockholm in 1676 to become Commander-in-chief of the Swedish army during the Scanian War. He was killed the following year at the Battle of Landskrona.

References

1617 births
1677 deaths
17th-century Swedish military personnel
Ingria
Field marshals of Sweden
Swedish nobility
People of the Scanian War